Lionel Roux (born 19 November 1970 in Megève, Haute-Savoie, France) is a French curler and curling coach.

Teams

Men's

Mixed

Mixed doubles

Record as a coach of national teams

References

External links

 Video: 

Living people
1970 births

Sportspeople from Haute-Savoie
French male curlers
French curling coaches